The Palestine Communist Party (Palestinische Komunistische Partei, abbreviated PKP) was a political party in the British Mandate of Palestine  formed in 1923 through the merger of the Palestinian Communist Party and the Communist Party of Palestine. In 1924 the party was recognized as the Palestinian section of the Communist International. In its early years, the party was predominantly Jewish, but held an anti-Zionist position.

History
In 1923, at the party congress, a position of support was adopted in favour of the Arab national movement as a movement "opposed to British imperialism and denounced Zionism as a movement of the Jewish bourgeoisie allied to British imperialism", a move that won it membership of the Comintern. The Party was also opposed to Zionist settlement in Palestine and to the Histadrut and its Jewish labor policy.

During the mid-1920s the party began recruiting Arab members. Karl Radek, as head of the Comintern's Eastern department, instructed the PCP that it must "become a party of Arab workers to which Jews can belong." According to British intelligence sources, the first Arab joined the party in 1924. By 1925 the party had eight Arab members. In that year the party was in contact with the Palestine Arab Workers Society. Simultaneously the party established relations with elite sections of the local Arab society. According to Fred Halliday, many Christian Arabs were attracted towards the party since they, being Orthodox, felt emotional bonds with Russia. Representatives from the party at the League against Imperialism's 1927 conference in Brussels clashed with Poale Zion, forming an anti-Zionist bloc with Arab nationalists from Palestine, Egypt and Syria within the League.

However, when the Comintern made its ultra-left turn in 1928 and denounced cooperation with national bourgeoisies in the colonies, the process of strengthening of the party amongst the Arab population was stalled. In 1930 the Comintern did yet another sharp turn, urging its Palestinian section to speedily increase the Arab representation amongst its cadres and leaders.

In December 1930, PCP ran in the elections for the Jewish Assembly of Representatives in Mandate Palestine, using a front organization called the Proletarian Party (Harishima Haproletarit). The party failed dismally.

During the rule of Joseph Stalin, the party militants in the Soviet Union suffered from heavy purges, including numerous people close to party leader Leopold Trepper. Daniel Averbach, one of the founders of the party, was brutally beaten and went mad. Tepper, himself, was expelled from Palestine by the British in 1929 and moved to Europe. During World War II, he led the Red Orchestra spy ring. In 1934 Radwan Al Hilu, a Palestinian Arab, was appointed by the Comintern as the secretary general of the party which he held until hisresignation from the party in 1943. 

In 1943 the party split, with the Arab members forming the National Liberation League in 1944. The PCP and NLL both initially opposed the 1947 UN Partition Plan, but accepted it after the Soviet Union endorsed it. The PCP changed its name to MAKEI, the Communist Party of Eretz Israel, after endorsing partition in October 1947. This was the first time the communists had used the term 'Eretz Israel' ('Land of Israel') in a party's name. However, it had been a widespread practice in Mandate Palestine to translate 'Palestine' as 'Eretz Israel' when translating into Hebrew. The party still viewed partition as a temporary detour on the road to a binational state. The two parties maintained contact during the 1948 war, and after the war, the NLL merged with Maki (the new name adopted by Maki, meaning the Communist Party of Israel) within the new state's borders.

From 1951 the Jordanian Communist Party organized Palestinians in the West Bank while a new Palestinian Communist Organization mobilized members in Gaza City. In 1975 a Palestinian Communist Organization was formed in the West Bank as a branch of the Jordanian party. In 1982 it severed ties with Jordan and merged with the organization in Gaza to become the new Palestine Communist Party. This Party later became the Palestinian People's Party. In 1987, it joined the Palestine Liberation Organization.

See also
Communist Party of Palestine
Da'am Workers Party
Hadash
Hagada Hasmalit
Hebrew Communists, a 1945 split that later merged with the PCP in 1948 before splitting again in 1949
Israeli Communist Opposition
Maariv (newspaper)
Ma'avak
Maki (historical political party)
Maki (political party)
National Liberation League in Palestine
Palestinian Communist Party (1922)
Palestinian Communist Party (1982 foundation)
Peace Now
Revolutionary Communist League (Mandatory Palestine)
Semitic Action
Socialist Workers Party (Mandatory Palestine)

References

Bibliography
Bashear, Suliman (1980). Communism in the Arab East: 1918–28. London: Ithaca Press.
Bernstein, Deborah S. (2000). Constructing Boundaries: Jewish and Arab Workers in Mandatory Palestine. SUNY Press. 
Beinin, Joel (1990). Was the Red Flag Flying There?: Marxist Politics and the Arab-Israeli Conflict in Egypt and Israel, 1948-1965. Berkeley: University of California Press
Connell, Dan (2001). Rethinking Revolution: New Strategies for Democracy & Social Justice: The Experiences of Eritrea, South Africa, Palestine and Nicaragua. The Red Sea Press. 
Kawar, Amal (1996). Daughters of Palestine: Leading Women of the Palestinian National Movement. SUNY Press. 
Younis, Mona M. (2000). Liberation and Democratization: The South African & Palestinian National Movements. University of Minnesota Press. 
Ran Greenstein. "Class, Nation, and Political Organization: The Anti-Zionist Left in Israel/Palestine", International Labor and Working-Class History, Volume 75, Issue 1, Spring 2009, pp. 85 - 108.

External link 
Communist Party of Palestine/Communist Party of Israel before the 1965 Split at marxists.org

1923 establishments in Mandatory Palestine
Anti-Zionist political parties
Comintern sections
Communist parties in Mandatory Palestine
Jewish anti-Zionism in Israel
Political parties established in 1923
Political parties with year of disestablishment missing
Anti-Zionism in Mandatory Palestine